The 2015–16 St. Louis Blues season was the 49th season for the National Hockey League franchise that was established on June 5, 1967.

Regular season

March
On March 9, the NHL announced that the Winter Classic will be held in St. Louis, at Busch Stadium on January 2, 2017, against their inter-division rival Chicago Blackhawks. It will be the first time the Blues have hosted it, and the 23rd NHL team to play in an outdoor game. It will be the 9th NHL Winter Classic, with the game marking the 50th anniversary of the inaugural season of Blues hockey when it was admitted to the NHL in June 1967.

On March 25, the Blues clinched a playoff spot for the fifth consecutive season with a win over the Vancouver Canucks, 4–0, at home. Brian Elliott registered his third consecutive shutout (4th of the season, one fewer than Jake Allen) tying the franchise record with Greg Millen who did in from Dec. 1–6 in 1989, turning aside 15 shots, after missing 10 games with a lower-body injury. Elliott's previous three consecutive shutout streaks came from March 22–27 in 2012, and again from April 7–11, 2013. He shutout the Canucks earlier in the week on March 19, 3–0 at Vancouver, stopping 19 shots, and on March 22 against the San Jose Sharks, 1–0, stopping 37 shots, some on 5-3 and 6-3 penalty kills near the end of the game. Rookie defenseman Joel Edmundson ("Eddy"), scored his first NHL goal, while Kyle Brodziak got the Blues on the board first with his second short-handed goal of the season. Fellow rookie, center Robby Fabbri scored his 18th goal of the season, pushing the Blues to a 2–0 lead in the first period. Carl Gunnarsson made it 3–0 in the 2nd period before Edmundson finished off the scoring in the 3rd period.

On March 26, the Blues became only the 11th team in NHL history to post four consecutive shutouts (a new Blues' franchise record), after Jake Allen beat the league-leading Washington Capitals, 4–0, turning aside 32 shots at Washington for his sixth shutout of the season. It's the first time of a team winning with four consecutive shutouts since the Phoenix Coyotes had five December 31, 2003 – January 9, 2004 to set the modern record. The Blues have not allowed a goal in 240:18, for the longest streak in their history.

On March 29, Brian Elliott's shutout streak ended at 193:12 with a goal by Mikhail Grigorenko at 18:12 in the first period at home.
The team's shutout streak ended at the same time at 258:29. Elliott is 10-0-1 in his last 12 starts, and leads the NHL with a 1.92 GAA and .935 SV%. The Blues again passed 100 points with a 46-22-9 record, and fighting for first place in the Central Division and Western Conference with the Dallas Stars after a 3–1 win over the Colorado Avalanche.

Playoffs

April
The Blues vs. Chicago Game 5 on April 21, set a Fox Sports Midwest all-time ratings record. It was the most-watched Blues game on that regional sports network in the team's 20 seasons. The double overtime thriller, lost by the Blues 4–3, earned a 15.0 rating with 183,000 households watching in the St. Louis market, according to Nielsen Media Research. It was the most-watched program of the day in St. Louis, as were the previous four games of the series.

Robby Fabbri scored his first goal of the playoffs and added an assist giving him four points overall in the series (1g, 3a). The game marked the 11th all-time overtime playoff game between the Blues and Hawks. The Blues hold a 7–4 record in those games and a 3-1 mark in multiple overtime games. The Blues recorded 46 shots against goaltender Corey Crawford – the sixth highest total in a playoff game in club history. Alexander Steen led the team with six, which tied for his second-highest total in a postseason contest.

The Blues vs. Chicago in Game 7 on April 25, shattered all previous ratings records for Fox Sports Midwest. It was the most-watched telecast in the history of that network with a 19.6 rating in the St. Louis DMA, averaging 239,000 households, according to Nielsen Media Research. Viewing peaked at a 25.3 rating/308,000 households/39 share at the end of the game.

Before April 25, the highest-rated event on FOX Sports Midwest was the St. Louis Cardinals' victory at Houston Astros on Sept. 28, 2011 – the final day of the regular season, on which the Cardinals' win and subsequent Atlanta Braves loss put the Cardinals in the postseason. That Cardinals' game earned an 18.0.

Blues-Blackhawks was the No. 1 program of the day in St. Louis. During the game, from 7:30 to 10:30 p.m., it beat the combined rating of St. Louis' ABC, CBS, FOX and NBC affiliates (17.9). All seven games of the series were the No. 1 program of the day in St. Louis.

Game 7 was the most-watched program in St. Louis since the Super Bowl on Feb. 7.

The previous high for a Blues game came just last week – a 15.0 for Game 5 against Chicago. FOX Sports Midwest is in its 20th season as the home of the Blues and 23rd with the Cardinals.

May
After two thrilling 4-3 games playoff series wins against the Blackhawks and Stars, but then a six-game loss in the Western Conference Finals to the Sharks, coach Ken Hitchcock, 64, signed a one-year contract extension on May 31, in what he said would be his last season coaching. He guided the St. Louis Blues to their first Western Conference Final appearance since 2001. Hitchcock has accumulated a 224-103-36 (.667) record in 363 games behind the bench in St. Louis. His coaching career has spanned 19 NHL seasons, 1,404 games and 757 wins, which ranks fourth all-time in NHL history. He's led his teams to 13 appearances in the Stanley Cup Playoffs, winning one championship with the Dallas Stars in 1999. All of the assistant coaches have been offered similar one-year contract extensions. Blues associate coach Brad Shaw, who has been with the club since 2006, has decided not to return and will instead pursue other opportunities.

June
After associate coach Brad Shaw and assistant coach Kirk Muller decided to leave for other opportunities, Mike Yeo, 42 (b. July 31), was announced on June 13 to replace coach Ken Hitchcock after his last year (2016–17), starting in the 2017–18 season. Yeo joins the Blues as associate coach, while Rick Wilson will join the staff as an assistant coach. Ray Bennett (assistant coach), Jim Corsi (goalie coach) and Sean Ferrell (video coach) will also return. Yeo spent the majority of the last five seasons as the head coach of the Minnesota Wild, leading the club to a 173-132-44 record, including a 46-28-8 mark in 2014–15, which was the second-best mark in Wild history. Yeo also guided Minnesota to three post-season appearances, including back-to-back trips to the second round in 2014 and 2015.

Standings

Schedule and results

Pre-season

Regular season

Playoffs

Player statistics

Skaters 
Final stats

Bold = led team

* Missed 49 games due to ankle fracture, Oct. 23-Feb. 10

** Missed 9 games due to right knee injury Feb. 6 (Feb. 8-Feb. 27)

*** Missed 15 games due to upper-body injury Feb. 20 (Feb. 21-Mar. 28)

**** Missed 54 final regular-season games, on IR due to right hamstring injury Dec. 5 (Dec. 6-Apr. 9). He was diagnosed with colitis on April 6, will be re-evaluated in 14 days. He returned to play in Game 3 of the StL-Chi playoffs, April 17.

Goaltenders
Final stats

†Denotes player spent time with another team before joining the Blues.  Stats reflect time with the Blues only.
‡Denotes player was traded mid-season.  Stats reflect time with the Team only.

* Activated on Feb. 21, after missing 17 games (Jan. 9-Feb. 20)

** Activated on Mar. 18, after missing 10 games (Feb. 23-Mar. 18)

BOLD = led NHL

Playoffs
Final stats

Suspensions/fines

Awards and Milestones

Awards

Milestones

Transactions
The Blues has been involved in the following transactions:

Trades

Free agents acquired

Free agents lost

Lost via waivers

Lost via retirement

Player signings

Draft picks

Below are the St. Louis Blues' selections at the 2015 NHL Entry Draft, to be held on June 26–27, 2015 at the BB&T Center in Sunrise, Florida.

Draft notes

 The St. Louis Blues' first-round pick went to the Winnipeg Jets as the result of a trade on February 11, 2015 that sent Evander Kane, Zach Bogosian and Jason Kasdorf to Buffalo in exchange for Tyler Myers, Drew Stafford, Joel Armia, Brendan Lemieux and this pick (being conditional at the time of the trade). The condition – Winnipeg will receive the lowest of Buffalo's first-round picks in 2015 – was converted on April 27, 2015 when the Islanders were eliminated from the 2015 Stanley Cup playoffs, ensuring that the Blues' first-round pick would be lower. Buffalo previously acquired this pick as the result of a trade on February 28, 2014 that sent Ryan Miller, Steve Ott and conditional second and third-round picks in 2014 to St. Louis in exchange for Jaroslav Halak, Chris Stewart, William Carrier, a conditional first-round pick in 2014 and this pick.
 The St. Louis Blues' third-round pick went the San Jose Sharks as compensation for Edmonton hiring Todd McLellan as their head coach on May 19, 2015. Edmonton previously acquired this pick as the result of a trade on July 10, 2013 that sent Magnus Paajarvi, a second-round pick in 2014 and a fourth-round pick in 2015 to St. Louis in exchange for David Perron and this pick.
 The Edmonton Oilers' fourth-round pick went the St. Louis Blues as the result of a trade on July 10, 2013 that sent David Perron and a third-round pick in 2015 to Edmonton in exchange for Magnus Paajarvi, a second-round pick in 2014 and this pick.
 The New Jersey Devils' fifth-round pick went to the St. Louis Blues as the result of a trade on March 22, 2013 that sent Matt D'Agostini and a seventh-round pick in 2015 to New Jersey in exchange for this pick (being conditional at the time of the trade). The condition – If D'Agostini is not re-signed by New Jersey then St. Louis will receive a fifth-round pick in 2015 – was converted on July 10, 2013.
 The St. Louis Blues' seventh-round pick went to the Florida Panthers as the result of a trade on September 28, 2013 that sent Scott Timmins and a sixth-round pick in 2014 to New Jersey in exchange for Krys Barch and this pick. New Jersey previously acquired this pick as the result of a trade on March 22, 2013 that sent a conditional fourth-round pick to St. Louis in exchange for Matt D'Agostini and this pick.

References

St. Louis Blues seasons
St. Louis Blues season, 2015-16
St Louis
St Louis